The 1997–98 season was the 76th season of competitive association football and 69th season in the Football League played by York City Football Club, a professional football club based in York, North Yorkshire, England. They finished in 16th position in the 24-team 1997–98 Football League Second Division. They were eliminated from the 1997–98 FA Cup in the second round by Wigan Athletic, from the 1997–98 League Cup in the second round by Oxford United, and from the 1997–98 Football League Trophy in the Northern section second round by Blackpool.

28 players made at least one appearance in nationally organised first-team competition, and there were 16 different goalscorers. Midfielder Mark Tinkler missed only two of the 53 competitive matches played over the season. Striker Rodney Rowe finished as leading goalscorer with 16 goals, of which 11 came in league competition, three came in the FA Cup, one came in the League Cup and one came in the Football League Trophy.

Match details

Football League Second Division

League table (part)

FA Cup

League Cup

Football League Trophy

Appearances and goals
Numbers in parentheses denote appearances as substitute.
Players with names struck through and marked  left the club during the playing season.
Players with names in italics and marked * were on loan from another club for the whole of their season with York.
Key to positions: GK – Goalkeeper; DF – Defender; MF – Midfielder; FW – Forward

See also
List of York City F.C. seasons

References
General

Source for match dates, league positions and results: 
Source for appearances, goalscorers and attendances: 
Source for goal times: 
Source for player details and discipline records: individual player pages linked from 

Specific

York City F.C. seasons
York City
Foot